Victor Cedric N'Koum (born 24 November 1989) is a Cameroonian footballer who plays as a midfielder for Championnat National 3 side Paris Saint-Germain B.

Career
N'Koum played first-tier football with Danish Superliga club Odense Boldklub.

In April 2015, while at Biel-Bienne, he suffered a cruciate ligament tear.

N'Koum joined Paris Saint-Germain Amateurs in the Championnat National 3 from amateur side Houilles AC in 2019.

References

External links 
 

Living people
1989 births
Footballers from Douala
Cameroonian footballers
Association football midfielders
US Créteil-Lusitanos players
Red Star F.C. players
USL Dunkerque players
Odense Boldklub players
FC Biel-Bienne players
FC Martigues players
Paris Saint-Germain F.C. players